Matt Reid and John-Patrick Smith were the defending champions but chose not to defend their title.

Denis Kudla and Daniel Nguyen won the title after defeating Jarryd Chaplin and Luke Saville 6–3, 7–6(7–5) in the final.

Seeds

Draw

References
 Main Draw

Levene Gouldin & Thompson Tennis Challenger - Doubles
2017 Doubles
2017 Levene Gouldin & Thompson Tennis Challenger